Valeriote is an Italian surname.

List of people with the surname 

 Frank Valeriote (born 1954), Canadian politician
Jeremy Valeriote, Canadian Politician

Surnames
Surnames of Italian origin
Italian-language surnames